Michael Fitzgerald is an Irish hurler with the Doon GAA club and the Limerick county panel.  He was an important part of Limerick's run to the 2007 All-Ireland Senior Hurling Championship final, adding a cutting edge to their attack.

References

Limerick inter-county hurlers
Doon hurlers
Year of birth missing (living people)
Living people